Saints Peter and Paul Roman Catholic Church Complex is located in Milwaukee, Wisconsin. The complex was added to the National Register of Historic Places in 1991 for its architectural significance.

Saints Peter and Paul parish was created in 1889, a response to the upper east side's rapidly growing German immigrant population during the 1880s and 90s, at the direction of Milwaukee's vicar general, the Right Reverend Leonard Batz. The parish began with forty-three families, and they initially worshiped in a temporary chapel on the corner of East Bradford and North Cramer Streets, while the permanent church was being built nearby.

The church building was designed by Henry Messmer of Milwaukee in Romanesque Revival style, with rusticated limestone foundations supporting cream brick walls. The general form is a large gable roof with a square centered tower at the front (pictured). High in the tower is a rose window, above that a belfry clad in ornamental sheet metal, and then a slate-roofed spire topped with a Latin cross. Across the front is a brick narthex added in 1939. The church's sides feature round-arched stained-glass windows. At the back is a semi-octagonal apse. The nave inside is little-changed from the 1800s, with the original oak pews, a plaster barrel vault ceiling, and the original Baroque-styled carved wood reredos. The cornerstone was laid in 1890 and the church was dedicated in 1892.

The convent was built in 1889, before the current church. It is a -story building designed by Herman Paul Schnetzky of Milwaukee in simplified Romanesque Revival style.

The current rectory behind the church was originally built in 1890 as the parish's elementary school. This building also was designed by Messmer, but in Neoclassical style, with a rusticated limestone foundation, cream brick walls above that, and a hip roof. Above the centered entrance is a lunette window. In 1912 the building was converted to a rectory.

The second elementary school was built in 1912, a -story Romanesque Revival building designed by Erhard Brielmaier and Sons in a style rather old-fashioned for 1912, to match the other buildings. The building has some Gothic-style decorations, and an oculus in each gable. Inside, the rooms have hardwood floors and plastered walls.

The parish added a three-story elementary school in 1956. The school is not included in the NRHP nomination.

The complex is listed on the NRHP for its architectural significance. Each building is a distinct design, but other than the 1956 school, they harmonize in materials and era, and together, the turn-of-the-century buildings are remarkably intact.

References

Roman Catholic churches in Milwaukee
Romanesque Revival church buildings in Wisconsin
Neoclassical architecture in Wisconsin
Roman Catholic churches completed in 1889
Churches on the National Register of Historic Places in Wisconsin
National Register of Historic Places in Milwaukee
Religious organizations established in 1889
1889 establishments in Wisconsin
19th-century Roman Catholic church buildings in the United States
Neoclassical church buildings in the United States